Ruff and Ready: Live in Manchester is the first DVD by Sonic Boom Six. It was filmed live on 19 February 2007 at the Manchester, England leg of the Ruff and Ready tour.

Track listing
Do It Today
Blood For Oil
Bigger than Punk Rock
Monkey See Monkey Do
Piggy in the Middle
A People’s History of the Future
Northern Skies
Marching Round in Circles
All-In
Wind ya Batty
Danger! Danger!
The Rape of Punk to Come
The Mighty Mighty Boom (encore)

Notes 
The DVD also includes a picture gallery (accompanied by an acoustic version of Northern Skies), and the promotional video for "All-In".

External links 
 DVD page from Sonic Boom Six's online shop

Sonic Boom Six albums
2007 live albums
2007 video albums
Live video albums